The Green Party of Prince Edward Island is a registered provincial political party and one of the three major parties in Prince Edward Island, Canada. The party was founded by Sharon Labchuk, a political organizer for the federal Green Party of Canada. It is a party in the international green political tradition, espousing environmentalism, grassroots democracy, and social justice.

The party was registered in 2005 and first ran candidates in the 2007 general election.  In the 2015 election, the party elected its first member of the provincial legislature: leader Peter Bevan-Baker defeated a Liberal incumbent to win the district of Kellys Cross-Cumberland with 54% of the vote. The party won 8 seats in the 2019 election and, as the second largest party in the legislature, formed the Official Opposition for the first time in the history of any Green party in Canada.

History

Founding (2006–2012)
The Green Party ran 18 candidates during its first election in May 2007, winning 3.04% of the vote, or 4.44% in ridings contested, and replacing the Island New Democrats as the Island's third party.  The result was the first time a Green Party had bested a New Democratic Party at the federal or provincial level in Canada.  A third of all candidates won more than 5.40%. Jamie Larkin had the best result of 8.45%, followed by dentist Peter Bevan-Baker at 6.84%, Cindy Burton at 6.68%, Party leader Sharon Labchuk at 6.03%, Denise Reiser at 5.79%, and Jodie Bowmaster at 5.40%.  All other candidates captured less than 5.0%, however 14 out of the 18 candidates had placed ahead of the NDP, with two of the four candidates who finished fourth doing so by just one and two votes.

The party ran a candidate in the 2007 by-election to replace Pat Binns in the riding of Belfast-Murray River. Candidate Ahmon Katz finished with 3.2%, ahead of NDP candidate Jane McNeil.

In the 2011 general election the party increased its number of candidates from 18 in the 2007 election to 22, and upped the vote share from 3% to 4.4%, or 5.3% in ridings contested, beating out the Island New Democrats for third place again. The party increased its votes per riding from 138 to 147, even though turnout in the province fell from 84 to 77%.  Party leader Sharon Labchuk, running in Charlottetown-Victoria Park, had the best result at 12.82%, followed by Elizabeth Schoales in Charlottetown-Brighton at 10.17%, and Peter Bevan-Baker in Kellys Cross-Cumberland at 9.36%.  At 59%, the party had the highest number of women candidates in the 2011 election.  The Green Party was the first Canadian political party to run more than 50% women candidates.

Bevan-Baker era (2012–present)

Sharon Labchuk resigned the leadership of the Green Party on July 12, 2012. She was succeeded by Peter Bevan-Baker on November 3, 2012.  The party released its platform for the 2015 election on March 20, 2015. In that election, leader Bevan-Baker was elected in the district of Kellys Cross-Cumberland with 54% of the vote, and won the party's first seat, and only the second seat ever won in the legislature for a third party.

The party secured their second seat in a by-election to fill a vacancy left by retiring Charlottetown-Parkdale MLA Doug Currie on November 27, 2017.  This was the first time in Island history that a third party won in a by-election.

Bevan-Baker pursued a strategy of broadening the Green Party's focus so as to place social concerns such as affordable housing at the forefront, rather than its traditional association with environmentalism, in the hopes of appealing to voters and appearing as more than a single-issue party. Heading into the 2019 election, several polls showed the Green Party in the lead, with Bevan-Baker the most-liked party leader; on election day, however, while the party won eight seats and is likely to form the official opposition in the 66th General Assembly of Prince Edward Island, they did not win the most overall seats as recent polls predicted.

In 2019, the party was elected the official opposition in the 66th General Assembly of Prince Edward Island.

Leadership

Leaders
Sharon Labchuk, 2005–2012
Darcie Lanthier, 2012 (interim)
Peter Bevan-Baker, 2012–present

Current MLAs
Trish Altass, Tyne Valley-Sherbrooke
Michele Beaton, Mermaid-Stratford
Hannah Bell, Charlottetown-Belvedere
Karla Bernard, Charlottetown-Victoria Park
Peter Bevan-Baker, New Haven-Rocky Point
Ole Hammarlund, Charlottetown-Brighton
Steve Howard, Summerside-South Drive
Lynne Lund, Summerside-Wilmot

Electoral record

See also 

 2012 Green Party of Prince Edward Island leadership election
 Green Party of Canada
 List of Green party leaders in Canada
 List of Green politicians who have held office in Canada
 List of Prince Edward Island general elections
 List of political parties in Prince Edward Island
 Politics of Prince Edward Island

References

External links 
 

 
2005 establishments in Prince Edward Island
Green liberalism
Political parties established in 2005
Provincial political parties in Prince Edward Island
Social democratic parties in Canada